Atimiola is a genus of longhorn beetles of the subfamily Lamiinae, containing the following species:

 Atimiola guttulata Bates, 1880
 Atimiola rickstanleyi Lingafelter & Nearns, 2007

References

Desmiphorini